Homer Hoch (July 4, 1879 – January 30, 1949) was a United States Representative from Kansas.

Biography
Born in Marion, Kansas, Hoch graduated from Baker University, Baldwin, Kansas, in 1902. He attended George Washington Law School, Washington, D.C., and Washburn Law School, Topeka, Kansas, from which he graduated in 1909.

He served as clerk and chief of the Appointment Division in the United States Post Office Department, Washington, D.C. from 1903 to 1905. He was private secretary to the Governor of Kansas Edward Wallis Hoch in 1907 and 1908. He engaged in the practice of law in Marion from 1909 to 1919 and was editor of the Marion County Record newspaper. He served as delegate to the Republican National Convention in 1928.

Hoch was elected as a Republican to the Sixty-sixth and to the six succeeding Congresses (March 4, 1919 – March 3, 1933). He was an unsuccessful candidate for reelection in 1932 to the Seventy-third Congress. He served as member and chairman of the State Corporation Commission of Kansas 1933-1939.

Hoch was elected a member of the Kansas Supreme Court in 1938. He was reelected in 1944 and served until his death in Topeka, January 30, 1949. He was interred in Highland Cemetery, Marion, Kansas.

Hoch's son, Wharton Hoch, was the editor and publisher of the Marion County Record in Marion, Kansas.

References

External links
 

1879 births
1949 deaths
People from Marion, Kansas
Justices of the Kansas Supreme Court
Republican Party members of the United States House of Representatives from Kansas